Ossipee is a town in Carroll County, New Hampshire, United States. The population was 4,372 at the 2020 census. It is the county seat of Carroll County. Ossipee, which includes several villages, is a resort area and home to part of Pine River State Forest.

History

Originally known as "Wigwam Village", and then "New Garden", the town was named for the Ossipee Indians, one of the twelve Algonquian tribes. It was once the site of an Indian stockade fort, designed to protect the tribe from the Mohawks in the west. In 1725, the Indian stockade was destroyed, and then rebuilt by Captain John Lovewell. The new fort was one of the largest in New England. The fort was located where the second green of Indian Mound Golf now is. Wood, ramrods and the brass bolt used for the gate were discovered when the course was built. On February 22, 1785, the legislature incorporated Ossipee as a town.

Although the surface of the town is "rough and uneven, and in some parts rocky and mountainous," farmers found it suitable for pasturage, as well as for cultivating wheat and potatoes. Principal goods were produce, lumber and cattle. In 1859, when the population was 2,123, Ossipee contained twelve sawmills, five gristmills, twelve clapboard and shingle mills, one bedstead factory, one door factory, a sash and blind factory, one paper mill and four tanneries. The Portsmouth, Great Falls & Conway Railroad in 1871 reached Ossipee Corner, with service extended in 1875 to Center Ossipee. The trains brought commerce and tourists, helping the town develop as a summer resort. Railroad service, however, would be discontinued in 1961 for passengers, and in 1972 for freight.

The town shares its name with the Ossipee Mountains, a circular mountain range marking the location of an ancient volcanic ring dike, which borders it on the west. Ossipee is a major source of sand and gravel, transported by railroad to Boston.

Ossipee claims to be the home of the first snowmobile. In 1917, Virgil D. White set up to create a patent for his conversion kit that changed the Ford Model T into a "snowmobile". He also copyrighted the term "snowmobile". At the time, the conversion kit was expensive, costing about $395. Virgil White applied his patent in 1918 and created his own snowmobile. In 1922, his conversion kit was on the markets and available only through Ford dealerships.

Geography
Ossipee is drained by the Ossipee River and its tributaries. Ossipee Lake, in the northeastern part of the town, is the source of the Ossipee River and receives its tributaries the Pine, Beech, Bearcamp and Lovell rivers.

The town is crossed by state routes 16, 25, 28 and 171.

Other villages include West Ossipee, at the northern junction of routes 16 and 25 near the border with Tamworth; Moultonville, directly west of Center Ossipee; and Water Village, along Route 171 near the border with Tuftonboro.

Adjacent municipalities
 Madison (north)
 Freedom (north)
 Effingham (east)
 Wakefield (southeast)
 Wolfeboro (south)
 Tuftonboro (southwest)
 Moultonborough (west)
 Tamworth (northwest)

Climate
According to the Köppen climate classification, Ossipee has a warm-summer humid continental climate (abbreviated Dfb).

Demographics

As of the census of 2010, there were 4,345 people, 1,826 households, and 1,165 families residing in the town. There were 3,057 housing units, of which 1,231, or 40.3%, were vacant. 1,045 of the vacant units were for seasonal or recreational use. The racial makeup of the town was 97.1% white, 0.4% African American, 0.3% Native American, 0.6% Asian, 0.0% Native Hawaiian or Pacific Islander, 0.1% some other race, and 1.5% from two or more races. 1.0% of the population were Hispanic or Latino of any race.

Of the 1,826 households, 25.2% had children under the age of 18 living with them, 49.1% were headed by married couples living together, 8.8% had a female householder with no husband present, and 36.2% were non-families. 29.6% of all households were made up of individuals, and 11.3% were someone living alone who was 65 years of age or older. The average household size was 2.28, and the average family size was 2.76.

In the town, 19.0% of the population were under the age of 18, 6.7% were from 18 to 24, 20.6% from 25 to 44, 34.3% from 45 to 64, and 19.4% were 65 years of age or older. The median age was 47.4 years. For every 100 females, there were 100.5 males. For every 100 females age 18 and over, there were 99.3 males.

For the period 2011–2015, the estimated median annual income for a household was $46,203, and the median income for a family was $60,758. Male full-time workers had a median income of $43,009 versus $37,468 for females. The per capita income for the town was $24,443. 17.9% of the population and 14.7% of families were below the poverty line. 16.8% of the population under the age of 18 and 12.7% of those 65 or older were living in poverty.

Sites of interest
 Ossipee Historical Society Museum
 Ossipee Lake
 Ossipee Pine Barrens

Notable people 

 Dale Bozzio (born 1955), lead singer of 1980s band Missing Persons
 Fred H. Brown (1879–1955), US senator, 59th governor of New Hampshire
 Captain John Lovewell (1691–1725), soldier
 Chester Earl Merrow (1906–1974), US congressman
 William B. Small (1817–1878), US congressman
 John Greenleaf Whittier (1807–1892), poet (summer resident)

See also
USS Ossipee

References

External links 

 
 Ossipee Public Library
 Historical Society of Ossipee
 New Hampshire Economic and Labor Market Information Bureau Profile
 Ossipee Genealogy Project

 
Towns in Carroll County, New Hampshire
County seats in New Hampshire
Towns in New Hampshire
New Hampshire placenames of Native American origin